Midoriyama may refer to:

 Mount Midoriyama, production sites for acrobatic competitions:
 in Japan; for Sasuke (TV series)
 in Las Vegas, NV, USA; for American Ninja Warrior
 in Germany; for Ninja Warrior Germany
 in the UK; for Ninja Warrior UK
 in Haifa, Israel; for Ninja Israel 
 in Poland; for Ninja Warrior Polska
 Midoriyama Middle School  in anime The Prince of Tennis